The Central State Marauders and Lady Marauders are the athletic teams that represent Central State University, located in Wilberforce, Ohio, in intercollegiate sports as a member of the Division II level of the National Collegiate Athletic Association (NCAA), primarily competing in the Southern Intercollegiate Athletic Conference (SIAC) since the 2015–16 academic year (with football joining first as an affiliate member from 2013–14 to 2015 before upgrading for all sports). The Marauders and Lady Marauders previously competed in the D-II Great Midwest Athletic Conference (G-MAC) from 2012–13 to 2014–15, and as an NCAA D-II Independent from 2002–03 to 2011–12; as well as competing in the American Mideast Conference of the National Association of Intercollegiate Athletics (NAIA) from 2000–01 to 2001–02.

Varsity teams
Central State competes in 11 intercollegiate varsity sports: Men's sports include basketball, cross country, football, track & field (indoor and outdoor) and volleyball; while women's sports include basketball, cross country, track & field (indoor and outdoor) and volleyball.

National championships

Team
The Marauders have won two NCAA team national championships.

Individual teams

Football 
The Central State University Marauder football team experienced much success in Division II and NAIA during the 1980s through 1995 under then head football coaches, William "Billy" Joe (1981 to 1993) and Rick Comegy (1993 to 1996). Under Billy Joe, the Marauders were NCAA Division II runners-up in 1983 and won the NAIA Football National Championship (Division I) in 1990 and 1992. Under Comegy, a former assistant coach under Joe, the Marauders won the NAIA Football National Championship (Division I) in 1995. The heyday of Central State football ended in the late 1990s when the university administration was forced to drop the football program in 1997 due to financial difficulties and a significant drop of enrollment. In 2005, under new administration leadership of president Dr. John W. Garland, Esq, (Class of 1971), the university reinstated the Central State Marauder football program.

Notable Marauder alumni who went on to play in the National Football League include: Vince Heflin, Vince Buck, Erik Williams, Hugh Douglas, Charles Hope, Brandon Hayes, Mel Lunsford, Kerwin Waldroup, and Dayvon Ross.

References

External links